Associazione Calcio Horatiana Venosa Associazione Sportiva Dilettante is an Italian association football club located in Venosa, Basilicata. It currently plays in Promozione. Its colors are green and yellow. the best player of Venosa Calcio is peppino since 1940 and the president masseur was Agostino

External links
Official homepage 

Football clubs in Basilicata
1989 establishments in Italy